Craig Robert Quigley (born 1952) is the Executive Director of the Hampton Roads Military and Federal Facilities Alliance.  He was an officer in the United States Navy and a former Deputy Assistant Secretary of Defense, who retired with the rank of Rear Admiral.

He graduated from the US Naval Academy as President of the Class of 1975. He later served aboard  before accepting a lateral transfer to the Restricted Line as a Public Affairs Officer. A career naval officer, Quigley served 27 years on active duty, achieving the rank of rear admiral and serving as Deputy Assistant Secretary of Defense (Public Affairs) at the Pentagon. As a Navy spokesman, he expressed the opposition of many in the military towards homosexuals serving in the military when he said, "Homosexuals are notoriously promiscuous" and that in shared shower situations, heterosexuals would have an "uncomfortable feeling of someone watching".

Upon retiring from the Navy, Quigley accepted a position as Vice President of Communications & Public Affairs for Lockheed Martin Maritime Systems & Sensors, leading a 30-person communications team across eight states for a $3.5B operating company.  After working for Lockheed Martin, Quigley became Director of Communication for U.S. Joint Forces Command in Hampton Roads, Virginia. He is currently the Executive Director of the Hampton Roads Military & Federal Facilities Alliance, a public-private partnership dedicated to attracting, retaining and growing federal facilities in the region.  He has held this position since September 2010.

Quigley is a 1975 graduate of the U.S. Naval Academy at Annapolis, Maryland, and was president of his class. A native of Winthrop, Iowa, he is an active public speaker, and believes in the value of mentoring juniors and developing teamwork to accomplish difficult objectives. He has been listed in “Who’s Who in American High Schools and Who’s Who in American Colleges and Universities, and was selected as an “Outstanding Young Man of America” in 1980. He serves as a member of the Communications Committee of the U.S. Naval Academy Alumni Association Board of Trustees; as Chair of the Board of Trustees of Stratford University; and a member of the Board of Directors of the Hampton Roads and Virginia Peninsula Chambers of Commerce.

On September 11, 2001, Rear Admiral Quigley was a media spokesperson at The Pentagon.

References

External links

1952 births
Living people
United States Naval Academy alumni
United States Navy admirals